The City Council of Milan is the top tier legislative body of the municipality of Milan, Lombardy, Italy. It consists of the directly elected mayor of Milan and of an elected 48-member assembly, which controls the mayor's governing actions and has the authority to enforce his resignation by a motion of no confidence.

The City Council is elected for five-year terms. Its seats are assigned proportionally to each party and list, with a majority bonus being awarded to the winning coalition to guarantee governability. The last election was held on 3-4 October 2021.

The City Council meets at Palazzo Marino, located in Piazza della Scala, Municipality 1.

Composition

The political system of the Comuni of Italy was changed in 1993, when a semi-presidential system for the mayoral election was introduced. Previously, the Council was elected under a pure proportional system and the Council had the power to elect and dismiss the Mayor of Milan; since 1993 the Mayor and the Council are jointly elected by citizens, with an electoral law that assures to the elected Mayor a political majority in the Council.

Under this system, the election of the Mayor is prior over the election of the Council. Voters express a direct choice for the Mayor or an indirect choice voting for the party of the candidate's coalition and this gives a result whereby the winning candidate is able to claim majority support in the new Council. The candidate who is elected Mayor has always a majority of 62% of seats (29 seats) in the City Council, which will support him during his term. The seats for each party of the coalition which wins the majority is determined proportionally.

In this type of system, the Council is generally elected for a five-year term, but, if the Mayor suffers a vote of no confidence, resigns or dies, under the simul stabunt, simul cadent clause introduced in 1993 (literally they will stand together or they will fall together), also the Council is dissolved and a snap election is called.

The Municipal Board (Italian: giunta comunale), the executive body of the city, chosen and presided directly by the mayor, is generally composed by members of the City Council, but also by external members.

Functions
The Council acts as the supreme legislative body of the city. It is convened and chaired by a speaker (president del consiglio comunale) appointed by the Council itself.

The Council can decide over programs and public works projects, institution and system of taxes, the general rules for the use of goods and services, forecasting and reporting financial statements. Resolution basic acts attributed by law to its competence are the municipal statute, the regulations, the general criteria on the structure of offices and services.

After the creation of the Metropolitan City of Milan in 2015, which with its Metropolitan Council has the power to coordinate the municipalities around Milan in providing basic services (including transport, school and social programs) and environment protection as the old Province of Milan did, the 2016 municipal administrative reform delegated to the 9 administrative Boroughs Councils of Milan some advisory functions related to local services, such as schools, social services, waste collection, roads, parks, libraries and local commerce.

City Hall

The City Council is seated at Palazzo Marino, a 16th-century palace located in Piazza della Scala, in the centre of Milan, Italy. Palazzo Marino has been Milan's city hall since 9 September 1861. It borders on Piazza San Fedele, Piazza della Scala, Via Case Rotte and Via Tommaso Marino.

The palace was built for, and is named after, the Genoan trader and banker Tommaso Marino. It became a property of the State in 1781.

The current Council meeting room was inaugurated on 30 June 1953. A ciceronian inscription from the previous meeting place of the Council – the notorious Sala Alessi on the second floor of the palace – is reported on the marble walls around the room:

Without personal interests · keep the people in mind · without (using) force

Presidents

This is a list of the presidents (Italian: presidenti del consiglio comunale) of the City Council since the 1993 electoral reform:

Political composition

Historical composition

Current composition

|- style="background-color:#E9E9E9;text-align:center;"
! colspan="4" rowspan="1" style="text-align:left;" | Parties and coalitions
! colspan="1" | Votes
! colspan="1" | %
! colspan="1" | Seats
|-
| style="background-color:pink" rowspan="8" |
| style="background-color:" |
| style="text-align:left;" | Democratic Party (Partito Democratico)
| PD
| 152,200 || 33.86 || 20
|-
| style="background-color:#E1354C" |
| style="text-align:left;" | Sala for Mayor (Sala Sindaco)
| SS
| 41,135 || 9.15 || 5
|-
| style="background-color:" |
| style="text-align:left;" | Green Europe (Europa Verde)
| EV
| 22,994 || 5.11 || 3
|-
| style="background-color:" |
| style="text-align:left;" | The Reformers (I Riformisti)
| IV-A
|  18,049 || 4.01 || 2
|-
| style="background-color:#802152" |
| style="text-align:left;" | Healthy Milan (Milano in Salute)
| MiS
|  7,367 || 1.64 || 1
|-
| style="background-color:" |
| style="text-align:left;" | United Milan (Milano Unita)
| MU
|  7,012 || 1.56 || 0
|-
| style="background-color:" |
| style="text-align:left;" | Radical Milan (Milano Radicale)
| MR
|  4,816 || 1.07 || 0
|-
| style="background-color:" |
| style="text-align:left;" | Volt Europa 
| V
|  2,052 || 0.56 || 0
|- style="background-color:pink"
| style="text-align:left;" colspan="4" | Sala coalition (Centre-left)
| 256,075 || 56.96 || 31
|-
| style="background-color:lightblue" rowspan="6" |
| style="background-color:" |
| style="text-align:left;" | League (Lega)
| L
| 48,283 || 10.74 || 6
|-
| style="background-color:" |
| style="text-align:left;" | Brothers of Italy (Fratelli d'Italia)
| FdI
| 43,889 || 9.76 || 5
|-
| style="background-color:" |
| style="text-align:left;" | Forza Italia 
| FI
| 31,819 || 7.08 || 3
|-
| style="background-color:#074A94"|
| style="text-align:left;" | Bernardo for Mayor (Bernardo Sindaco)
| BS
| 14,055 || 3.13 || 2
|-
| style="background-color:" |
| style="text-align:left;" | Popular Milan (Milano Popolare)
| MP
|  8,367 || 1.86 || 1
|-
| style="background-color:#0000AC" |
| style="text-align:left;" | European Liberal Party
| PLE
| 970 || 0.22 || 0
|- style="background-color:lightblue"
| colspan="4" style="text-align:left;" | Bernardo coalition (Centre-right)
|  147,383 || 32.78 || 17
|-
| style="background-color:#366A9F" |
| style="text-align:left;" colspan="2" | Paragone for Mayor–Great North 
| 
| 12,974 || 2.89 || 0
|-
| style="background-color:" |
| style="text-align:left;" colspan="2" | Five Star Movement (Movimento Cinque Stelle)
| M5S
| 12,517 || 2.78 || 0
|-
| style="background-color:" |
| style="text-align:left;" colspan="2" | Milan in Common (Milano in Comune)
| MC
|  7,175 || 1.60 || 0
|-
| style="background-color:" |
| style="text-align:left;" colspan="2" | Others 
| 
|  12,989 || 2.99 || 0
|-
| colspan="7" style="background-color:#E9E9E9" | 
|- style="font-weight:bold;"
| style="text-align:left;" colspan="4" | Total
| 449,563 || 100.00 || 48
|-
| colspan="7" style="background-color:#E9E9E9" | 
|-
| style="text-align:left;" colspan="4" | Votes cast / turnout 
| 491,141 || 47.72 || style="background-color:#E9E9E9;" |
|-
| style="text-align:left;" colspan="4" | Eligible voters
| 1,029,232 ||  || style="background-color:#E9E9E9;" |
|-
| colspan="7" style="background-color:#E9E9E9" | 
|-
| style="text-align:left;" colspan="7" | Source: Ministry of the Interior
|}

Notes

Government of Milan
City councils in Italy